Zechariah ben Abkilus (also Zechariah ben Abqilus, Zecharya ben Avkulas, Amphikalos) was a Jewish scholar and one of the leaders of the Zealots. He lived in Jerusalem at the time of the destruction of the Second Temple. According to the Talmud, the authority which he enjoyed among the rabbis of Jerusalem was the cause of the downfall of the city. Zechariah was present at the banquet famous for the affair of Kamsa and Bar Kamsa; and though his influence might have prevented the disgrace of Bar Ḳamsa, he did not exercise it. Later, when a calf sent by the emperor was blemished by Bar Ḳamsa prior to being received as an offering to the Temple, the Hillelites would have accepted it to frustrate Bar Ḳamsa, had not Zechariah, acting in the interest of the school of Shammai, ruled against, or (according to) refrained from voting and thus rendered the decision negative. 

The people wished to kill Bar Ḳamsa so that he should not be able to tell the emperor of the refusal, but Zechariah once more restrained them from carrying out their design. R. Johanan, on the other hand, or, according to another source, R. Jose, declared that the humility of Zechariah b. Abḳilus, in refusing to cast his vote, caused the destruction of the Temple. He is recorded as following neither the Bet Hillel nor the Bet Shammai with regard to holding date-stones on the Sabbath. He is probably referred to by Josephus.

References

	Grätz, History of the Jews, iii. 458, 509, 817-819;
	Derenbourg, Hist. p. 257.
 By the Executive Committee of the Editorial Board, M. Seligsohn, Kaufmann Kohler

Talmud rabbis of the Land of Israel
Ancient history of Jerusalem
1st-century rabbis
Date of death unknown